Kalibův zločin is a Czech novel by Karel Václav Rais. It was first published in 1895.

1895 Czech novels